Gallery Girls is an American reality television series on Bravo. The series premiered on August 13, 2012.

Premise
The series follows several weeks in the lives of seven ambitious young women in New York City who struggle with the intense environment of the art world while attempting to find their "dream jobs". The group shares a passion for art, but they're divided between their Manhattan and Brooklyn lifestyles, with different views and tastes toward art, men, and fashion. Throughout the series, the ladies tackle financial setbacks, family issues, and the pressures of jump-starting their lives.

Bravo did not renew the show for a second season.

Cast
 Liz Margulies
 Kerri Lisa
 Chantal Chadwick
 Claudia Reardon 
 Angela Pham
 Amy Poliakoff
 Maggie Schaffer

Episodes

References

External links 

 
 
 

2010s American reality television series
2012 American television series debuts
2012 American television series endings
English-language television shows
Bravo (American TV network) original programming
Television series by Magical Elves
Women in New York City